Natore Rajbari (also known as Pagla Raja's Palace, Natore Palace) was a prominent royal palace in Natore, Bangladesh. It was the residence and seat of the Rajshahi Raj family of zamindars. The famous queen Rani Bhabani lived here and after the death of her husband, expanded both the estate and the palace.

History
In the mid seventeenth century one Kamadev Moitra served as tehsildar to the Puthia Raj family. Kamadev's second son Raghunandan Moitra was selected by the Raja to be his agent at the court of Nawab Murshid Quli Khan, the overlord of all Bengal. When the Nawab moved his court from Dhaka to what became known as Murshidabad he took Raghunandan with him and appointed him his Dewan or minister. The Nawab proceeded to confiscate the estates of zamindars who failed to conform to his new regulations, and a number of such estates were acquired by Ramjivan Moitra, the elder brother of his Dewan Raghunandan. In due course Ramjivan was given the title of Raja and set up his headquarters in Natore. His estate was generally referred to as the "Rajshahi Zamindari".

The estate had an area of nearly 13,000 square miles and included not only much of North Bengal but also large parts of the areas later comprising the administrative districts of Murshidabad, Nadia, Jessore, Birbhum and Burdwan. To rule this extensive Zamindari and collect revenue properly, he divided all Zamindaris into three centers. These were Sherpur in Bogra district, Baranagar in Murshidabad district and Natore. Baranagar was located half a mile north of Azimnagar railway station by the administrative advantages. Rarely Raghunandan had to go to Nawab Darbar, so he stayed at Baranagar most of the time. Staying at Baranagar helped him to maintain the royal duty of Natore.

The first palace or Rajbari at Natore was built by Raja Ramjivan Moitra. The palace was surrounded by two sets of moats which are still extant. After the division of the estate a separate palace was built for the junior branch of the dynasty. Many of the original buildings were destroyed by the earthquake of 1897 and subsequently rebuilt or replaced.

Ramjivan's Dewan Doyaram was granted landed estates and the title of Ray Raiyan by Nawab Murshid Quli Khan in recognition of his service in apprehending a recalcitrant zamindar named Sitaram Roy. In due course Doyaram established his own dynasty the Dighapatia Raj with its own palace Dighapatia Palace.

Raja Ramjivan was succeeded by his adopted son Ramkanta. After Raja Ramkanta's early death the Natore estate was ably managed by his widow, known as Rani Bhabani, who became famous for her good works.

In 1797, following the death of Rani Bhabani's adopted son Raja Ramkrishna, the Natore estate was divided between his two sons Bishwanath and Sibnath, and thenceforth both a Senior and a Junior royal house remained in existence until the abolition of all zamindar estates in 1950.

Historical references

The zamindari of Rajshahi, the second in rank in Bengal and yielding an annual revenue of about twenty-five lakhs of rupees, has risen to its present magnitude during the course of the last eighty years by accumulating the property of a great number of dispossessed zamindars, although the ancestors of the present possessor had not, by inheritance, a right to the property of a single village within the whole zamindari. - Warren Hastings

[The Rajshahi Zamindari] is the most unwieldy extensive zamindari of Bengal or perhaps in India. [It] produces at least four-fifths of all the silk, raw or manufactured, used in or exported from the ... Empire of Hindustan. - James Grant

Timeline
(Some dates approximate)

Sources: A Short History of Natore Raj, District Gazetteer, Doctoral Thesis by S.M. Rabiul Karim

Photographs: current

Photographs: archival

See also
 Puthia Rajbari
 Dighapatia Raj
 Uttara Ganabhaban
 List of Palaces
 Tajhat Palace
 Ahsan Manzil
 List of archaeological sites in Bangladesh

References

Palaces in Bangladesh
Museums in Bangladesh
Natore District
Indo-Saracenic Revival architecture